The Society for Modeling and Simulation International (SCS) is a membership-based, technical association of simulationists.  SCS promotes the use of modeling and simulation in a variety of application areas. SCS was established in 1952 as a nonprofit, volunteer-driven corporation called Simulation Councils, Inc. Simulation Councils, Inc. became The Society for Computer Simulation.

SCS organizes meetings, sponsors and co-sponsors national and international conferences, and publishes the SIMULATION: Transactions of The Society for Modeling and Simulation International and The Journal of Defense Modeling and Simulation magazines.

Publications 
SCS publishes two journals as well as a monthly general interest newsletter:
The Journal of Defense Modeling and Simulation: Applications, Methodology, Technology (JDMS)
SIMULATION: Transactions of The Society for Modeling and Simulation International
SCS M&S Newsletter

SCS also regularly publishes special issues of both our peer-reviewed journals.

Conferences 
Each year SCS holds events where M&S professionals from around the world come together to advance their professional development share ideas, benchmark processes, and network with each other.

References

External links
SCS official Facebook page 

Military simulation
International organizations based in the United States
Engineering societies based in the United States